Teresa LaBarbera Whites is an American A&R, music executive, talent scout, and executive producer, best known for discovering Destiny's Child and Jessica Simpson. She is currently the A&R executive for Chloe x Halle.

Originally the Southwest regional talent scout for Sony Music in the 1990s, Whites was offered an A&R position with Columbia Records, eventually pitching and signing Destiny's Child and Jessica Simpson to Columbia. Over the next eight years, she would organize several multi-platinum projects: Sweet Kisses (1999), The Writing's on the Wall (1999), Survivor (2001), In This Skin (2003), Dangerously in Love (2003), and Destiny Fulfilled (2004). Whites was then offered an A&R Executive position with Jive/Zomba, where she would oversee the direction of Nick Lachey's 2006 solo breakthrough album What's Left of Me, as well as various Backstreet Boys, JC Chasez, and Britney Spears projects. Whites would eventually reunite with Destiny's Child member Beyoncé Knowles in 2011, first becoming Senior Vice-President, A&R of Columbia Records, and then subsequently becoming A&R executive for Knowles' label imprint Parkwood Entertainment, overseeing song selection for her eponymous fifth album, Lemonade, and several other projects. Whites also operates several annual writing retreats for songwriters at The Arbor House Bed & Breakfast which she owns with her husband in Texas.

Selected executive production and a&r credits
Credits are courtesy of Discogs, Tidal, Apple Music, and AllMusic.

Awards and nominations

References 

Living people
Year of birth missing (living people)